Dana Ellyn is a vegan artist who incorporates political and animal cruelty themes in her work. In 2008, Ellyn created paintings of every American President, as well as each of the 2008 Presidential candidates.

From May 2016 - May 2017, her portrait of artist (and husband) Matt Sesow was the introductory painting to Sesow's 'Shock & Awe' exhibit at the American Visionary Art Museum in Baltimore, Maryland. From December 2018 - March 2019, her painting 'Baby Back Ribs' was exhibited in the 'Grotesque in Art' exhibit at the Museum of Art St. Petersburg in St Petersburg Russia.

Her controversial 2009 Blasphemy Day show received coverage by CNN, USA Today, Huffington Post and NPR. She paints from Mather Studios in downtown Washington, DC.

Education
Ellyn earned a BA degree from The George Washington University.

References 

Year of birth missing (living people)
Living people
21st-century American painters
American veganism activists
Artists from Washington, D.C.
George Washington University alumni